The Taipei Metro Xinhai station (formerly transliterated as Hsinhai Station until 2003) is a station on the Brown Line located in Wenshan District, Taipei, Taiwan.

Station overview

This two-level, elevated station has two side platforms and a single exit.

Station layout

Exits
Single Exit: On Xinhai Rd., Sec. 4

Around the station
Xinhai Elementary School
Dunnan Linyin Community

References

Railway stations opened in 1996
Wenhu line stations